The Beijing News or Xīn Jīng Bào is a Chinese daily newspaper.

Beijing News or Jing Bao may also refer to:
 Peking Gazette or Jīng Bào, a defunct newspaper

See also
 Beijing#Etymology
 Beijing Daily or Běijīng Rìbào, a daily newspaper from Beijing
 Beijing Evening News or Běijīng Wǎnbào, a Chinese daily evening newspaper